The Journal of European Studies is a quarterly peer-reviewed academic journal that covers the field of European studies especially the cultural history of Europe since the Renaissance. The editor-in-chief is John Flower (University of Kent). It was established in 1971 and is currently published by SAGE Publications.

Abstracting and indexing 
The Journal of European Studies is abstracted and indexed in:
 Academic Search Elite
 Academic Search Premier
 Arts & Humanities Citation Index
 British Humanities Index
 Current Contents/Arts & Humanities
 Scopus

External links 
 

SAGE Publishing academic journals
English-language journals
European studies journals
Quarterly journals
Publications established in 1971